Jaime Fernández (born 17 September 1968) is a Spanish butterfly swimmer who competed in the 1992 Summer Olympics.

References

1968 births
Living people
Spanish male butterfly swimmers
Olympic swimmers of Spain
Swimmers at the 1992 Summer Olympics
20th-century Spanish people